Pennhurst State School and Hospital, originally known as the Eastern Pennsylvania State Institution for the Feeble-Minded and Epileptic was a state-run institution for mentally and physically disabled individuals of Southeastern Pennsylvania located in Spring City. After 79 years of controversy, it closed on December 9, 1987.

History

Overview
In 1903, the Pennsylvania Legislature authorized the creation of the Eastern State Institution for the Feeble-Minded and Epileptic and a commission was organized to take into consideration the number and status of the feeble-minded and epileptic persons in the state and determine a placement for construction to care for these residents. This commission discovered 1,146 feeble-minded persons in insane hospitals and 2,627 in almshouses, county-care hospitals, reformatories, and prisons, who were in immediate need of specialized institutional care.

The legislation stated that the buildings would be in two groups, one for the educational and industrial department, and one for the custodial or asylum department. The institution was required to accommodate no fewer than five hundred inmates or patients, with room for additions. Wesley White, the former president of the American Association of Medical Dosimetrists, was appointed superintendent of the facility.

Construction and design

Building designation
Out of the first few buildings constructed, 'F' was the Girl's Dining Room, 'G' was the Kitchen and Store Room, 'H', 'I' and 'K' were a Cottage for Girls, 'N' was the Boys' Dining Room, 'P' was the Teacher's Home, 'Q', T', 'U' and 'V' were a Cottage for Boys, 'R' was a School, 'W' was Laundry and Sewing, and 'X' was the Power House.

'P' was used as a temporary Administration building until the institution's opening in 1918 along with the opening of 'L' and 'M' in 1919. In 1921, Whitman and Wilson I and II were constructed along with Penn Hall for employee housing; in 1929, the Assembly building was complete and functioned as the gymnasium and auditorium.

The buildings on lower campus are currently labeled with letters such as 'F', 'I', 'K', 'P', 'Q', 'R', 'N', 'U', 'V', 'T', 'W' and 'X' with names later assigned in the 1960s (see below).

In 1930, the first buildings on the upper campus, otherwise known as the Female Colony, were completed and named Pershing, Buchanan, Audubon and Keystone. Capitol Hall was erected after World War II along with Devon constructed on lower campus. Horizon Hall opened later in 1971.

Lower campus buildings
Administration,
Philadelphia,
Quaker,
Rockwell,
Franklin,
Nobel,
Union,
Vincennes,
Tinicum,
Industry,
Penn,
Devon,
Mayflower,
Limerick,
Assembly,
Storeroom,
Laundry,
Whitman,
Wilson I,
Wilson II,
Hershey

(Rockwell, Nobel, Franklin and Hershey were all demolished in 2020)

Upper campus buildings
Pershing,
Buchanan,
Audubon,
Keystone,
Capitol,
Horizon

(Buchanan, Audubon, Keystone, Capital were demolished in 2018)

Other buildings
Power House,
Treatment Plant,
Director's House,
Green House,
Dairy Farm

Appearance

The older buildings, designed by Phillip H. Johnson, were two-storied, and made of red brick, terra cotta, and granite trimmings. They were connected by fire-proof tunnels with walkways on top of the tunnels for the use of transporting residents, with a parallel steam piping system, and were distributed on the  campus in the cottage plan formation. The buildings were designed to provide a large number of small rooms occupied by two to three beds, a few small dormitories with eight to ten beds, and a large day room for exercise. George Lovatt was the architect for several of the buildings constructed post-1937.

The central Administration building has two side porte-cocheres, a front portico and a copper cupola in the center of the roof. The hospital building, Whitman, and Wilson I and II are not tunnel-connected, nor is Penn Hall and the Power House. The remaining cottage buildings are 'L' and 'I' shaped with the exception of Dietary, which is'Y'shaped, and Devon Hall, which is 'H' shaped.

Railroad
The Pennsylvania Railroad created a Pennhurst Station on its Schuylkill Division to accommodate Pennhurst. Coal and other supplies were delivered by rail for decades to operate the power house. Tracks are still visible under the pavement behind Dietary and Devon Hall, which allowed boxcars to be brought directly onto the main campus. The railroad tracks have been removed and are now part of the Schuylkill River Trail.

General operation

Opening
On November 23, 1908, "Patient number 1" was admitted to the hospital. Within four years of operation, Pennhurst was already overcrowded and under pressure to admit immigrants, orphans, and criminals.

Classification
Residents were classified into mental categories of imbecile or insane, into physical categories of epileptic or healthy, and into dental categories of good, poor or treated teeth when admitted.

Industries
The branches of industry which residents were assigned to were mattress making, shoe making and repair, grading, farming, laundry, domestic duties, sewing, baking, butchering, painting, and working in the store.

Segregation and eugenics
In 1913, the legislature appointed a Commission for the Care of the Feeble-Minded which stated that disabled people were unfit for citizenship and posed a menace to the peace, and thus recommended a program of custodial care. Furthermore, the Commission desired to prevent the intermixing of the genes of those imprisoned with the general population. In the Biennial Report to the Legislature submitted by the Board of Trustees, Pennhurst's Chief Physician quoted Henry H. Goddard, a leading eugenicist, as follows:

Every feeble-minded person is a potential criminal. The general public, although more convinced today than ever before that it is a good thing to segregate the idiot or the distinct imbecile, they have not as yet been convinced as to the proper treatment of the defective delinquent, which is the brighter and more dangerous individual.

Treatment of women
In 1916, the Board of Trustees initiated a plan to increase the capacity of the Institution by constructing cottages specifically for women to segregate them from the men, in part to prevent pregnancies.

Conditions exposed
In 1968, conditions at Pennhurst were exposed in a five-part television news report anchored by local WCAU-TV correspondent Bill Baldini.

In 1981, a Time magazine article described the place as having "a history of being understaffed, dirty and violent." In 1983, nine employees were indicted on charges ranging from slapping and beating patients (including some in wheelchairs) to arranging for patients to assault each other.

The Halderman Case, which resulted in the closure of the institution, also detailed widespread patient abuse.

Closure
In 1977, U.S. District Judge Raymond J. Broderick ruled that the conditions at Pennhurst State School violated patients' constitutional rights. The lawsuit that led to his ruling was filed May 30, 1974, by Philadelphia attorney David Ferleger representing the patients of the Pennhurst State School. The suit was later joined by the United States and by the Pennsylvania Association for Retarded Citizens. Pennhurst State School was ultimately closed in 1987. The 1,156 people who lived there on the date of the Court's order (March 17, 1978) moved into small community homes called Community Living Arrangements. These settings supported three or fewer people, with 24 hour staffing if needed. This process of deinstitutionalization required nine years, and included discussion of treatment plans with each person and family.

Halderman v. Pennhurst State School and Hospital
The allegations of abuse led to the first lawsuit of its kind in the United States, a federal class action, Halderman v. Pennhurst State School & Hospital, which asserted that those with developmental disabilities in the care of the state have a constitutional right to appropriate care and education. Terri Lee Halderman had been a resident of Pennhurst, and following multiple episodes of abuse, she and her family filed suit in the federal district court. The suit started after Terri had visited her parents at home and was found to have unexplained bruises. Although the case was not expected to reach the level it did, the courts later found that conditions at Pennhurst were unsanitary, inhumane and dangerous, violating the Fourteenth Amendment, and that Pennhurst used cruel and unusual punishment in violation of the Eighth and Fourteenth Amendments, as well as the Pennsylvania Mental Health and Retardation Act of 1966 (MH/MR). The District Court ruled that certain of the patients' rights had been violated. The District Court decision was the first time that any federal court ruled that an institution must be closed based on a constitutional right to community services.

The rulings collectively lent credence to the nascent "deinstitutionalization" movement, which sought to move mental patients from hospitals to halfway houses or reintegrate them into their families. The rulings also aligned with the increasing tendency of federal courts to take control of school districts, prisons and other state institutions in order to enforce citizens' rights. Ultimately, however, the U.S. Supreme Court vacated the judgment based on the Eleventh Amendment principle that federal courts cannot order state officials to comply with state laws. As noted below, the institution was eventually closed pursuant to a settlement agreement that required that community-based services be offered to all of its residents.

The case became an important rule of law known as the Pennhurst Doctrine, which has been cited by state Attorneys General as binding precedent under United States constitutional law.

Modern day

The United States Department of Veterans Affairs, or the VA, acquired the upper campus of Pennhurst and began work to reuse it as a veterans' home. In 1986, the upper campus cottage units reopened as the Southeastern Veterans' Center. In 1990, renovations began on Horizon Hall, one of the newest buildings at Pennhurst, as part of a project to establish a nursing facility at the veterans' center. It reopened in 1993 as Coates Hall. After many years of determining what to do with Pennhurst, Congressman Jim Gerlach sought to establish a federal veterans cemetery at Pennhurst in 2003 but the VA rejected the proposal.

In 2001, the state adopted the Keystone Principles concerning the state's duties to maintain historic property and to consult with the Pennsylvania Historical and Museum Commission before transferring the property into private hands. Chester County officials approved a private development and Pennhurst was sold to a developer, Pennhurst Associates, for two million dollars. The Pennhurst Memorial and Preservation Alliance (PMPA) was formed to advocate for certain uses of the site.

Pennhurst was added to Pennsylvania's list of the most at-risk Pennsylvania properties as well as the International Coalition of Sites of Conscience, a worldwide network of historic sites specifically dedicated to remembering struggles for justice.

In partnership with the Preservation Alliance for Greater Philadelphia, PMPA obtained a grant to complete a re-use design and feasibility study of the Pennhurst campus. By 2010, the administration building had been partially renovated and reopened as the Pennhurst Asylum seasonal haunted attraction. The attraction has been successful, though controversial among locals and those previously affiliated with Pennhurst.

The Department of Environmental Protection permitted the composting operation at Pennhurst to maintain no more than 25 tons. It is no longer in operation.

In 2015, the Pennhurst Memorial and Preservation Alliance began working with the Southeastern Veterans' Center to obtain the superintendent's residence for a future museum and interpretive center.

By the end of 2016, demolition had begun on some of the buildings on the upper campus.

In 2017, bookings for daytime history tours, photography tours, and overnight paranormal investigations became available through the haunted attraction's website. Proceeds from the tours go towards the upkeep of the grounds and restoration of the remaining buildings.

The Travel Channel's television show Destination Fear filmed at the location for the fifth episode of their first season in 2019 .

By 2020, Hershey, Rockwell, and Dietary halls were all deemed unsafe for reuse. That March, demolition began and by November, all three buildings had been demolished.

On June 8, 2021 heavy metal band Motionless in White performed their Deadstream 2: Live at Pennhurst concert on the grounds in front of the main building entrance. The concert was streamed the following day.

See also

Mental health

References

External links

Antiquity Echoes History, present day photos, and video of Pennhurst State School and Hospital
Wayne Benner Ultimate Pennhurst Photo Collection by Wayne Benner
Photadyta History and Photographs
Soul-Imagery.com Pennhurst Gallery
Pennhurst Memorial and Preservation Alliance
i go home, a documentary about former residents and the closure of Pennhurst

Hospital buildings completed in 1908
Education in Pennsylvania
Defunct hospitals in Pennsylvania
Haunted attractions (simulated)
1908 establishments in Pennsylvania